Iniesta is a municipality located in the province of Cuenca, Castile-La Mancha, Spain. According to the 2009 census (INE), the municipality has a population of 4,685 inhabitants.

Villages
Iniesta
Alcahozo 
Casas de Juan Fernández

See also
Manchuela

References

External links
Iniesta Town Hall

Municipalities in the Province of Cuenca